Daniel Kay Sengewald (born 16 December 1975) is a German former professional footballer who played as a defender.

Sengewald was born in Jena, East Germany. He played most of his career in the lower leagues of German football. His first taste of non-German football came with Belgian club Royal Antwerp, before moving to Scotland to play for top-flight side Motherwell. He made seven appearances at Fir Park, but also got sent-off in his final game. He then left Scotland to play for another batch of lower-league German clubs, before then moving to Albania with Partizani.

References

External links
 

Living people
1975 births
People from Bezirk Gera
Sportspeople from Jena
German footballers
Footballers from Thuringia
Association football defenders
Scottish Premier League players
FC Carl Zeiss Jena players
FC Sachsen Leipzig players
TSV 1860 Munich players
TSV 1860 Munich II players
Royal Antwerp F.C. players
Motherwell F.C. players
Bonner SC players
SC Verl players
SSV Ulm 1846 players
German expatriate footballers
German expatriate sportspeople in Belgium
Expatriate footballers in Belgium
German expatriate sportspeople in Scotland
Expatriate footballers in Scotland